William George Hulme Lever (20 April 1904 – 25 September 1986) was a former Australian rules footballer who played with Carlton in the Victorian Football League (VFL).

Family
The son of William Lever (1877–1909) and Sophia Amelia Lever (1882–1962), née Potter, William George Hulme Lever was born at Prahran, Victoria on 20 April 1904.

Football

Carlton (VFL)
Bill Lever played fourteen games for Carlton in 1929–30.

Preston (VFA)
Bill Lever subsequently played seven games for Preston in the 1930 season.

Military service
Aged 36, Lever enlisted in the Volunteer Defence Corps during World War II in 1940, and served in Melbourne until 1944.

Notes

External links 

Bill Lever's playing statistics from The VFA Project
Bill Lever's profile at Blueseum

1904 births
1986 deaths
Rochester Football Club players
Carlton Football Club players
Preston Football Club (VFA) players
Australian rules footballers from Melbourne
Volunteer Defence Corps soldiers
Military personnel from Melbourne
People from Prahran, Victoria